Thales Group is a French multinational company that designs, develops and manufactures electrical systems as well as devices and equipment for the aerospace, defence, transportation and security sectors. The company is headquartered in Paris' business district, La Défense, and its stock is listed on the Euronext Paris.

Having been known as Thomson-CSF since its foundation in 1968, the company was rebranded Thales (named after the Greek philosopher Thales and pronounced , reflecting its pronunciation in French) in December 2000. A communication audit, launched in spring that year, highlighted Thomson-CSF's image deficit, particularly among the young French graduates it was seeking to recruit. The wish to liven up its image as well as the expansion of its business worldwide were cited among the reasons for the change. Thales is partially owned by the French State and operates in more than 56 countries. It had 80,000 employees and generated €18.4 billion in revenues in 2019. As of 2017, it is also the 8th largest defence contractor in the world with 55% of its total sales being military sales.

Patrice Caine was appointed  Chairman and  CEO of Thales in December 2014. Caine remains Chairman as of August 2022.

History

Thales' predecessor, Thomson-CSF, evolved from Compagnie Française Thomson-Houston (CFTH), which was established in 1893. However, Thomson-CSF itself was established in 1968 when Thomson-Brandt (then renamed CFTH) merged its electronics arm with that of Compagnie générale de la télégraphie sans fil (CSF).

On 28 October 1999, Samsung Electronics and Thomson-CSF agreed to create a joint venture with each company investing and holding 50% of the shares. Thomson-CSF will receive technology transfer of Samsung's defense products such as communication equipment, satellite communication systems and terminals, fire control system, detection and tracking devices, radar guidance equipment, and gunner's sight (KGPS), while Samsung will gain access to Thomson-CSF's network for overseas exports.

Thales formed a joint venture with Raytheon in June 2001 to combine their radar and communications systems divisions. Named ThalesRaytheonSystems, the firm is 50% owned by both parent companies. The joint venture was restructured in 2016 to switch focus exclusively on NATO agencies and NATO member states.

In 2002, Thales set up the joint venture company Armaris with the French shipbuilder DCN to offer a total "bottom up" shipbuilding capability. Also in 2002, Thales Broadcast Multimedia, a former subsidiary of Thales, provided China with standard short-wave radio-broadcasting equipment designed for general public radio broadcasting. Although the contract was not at all for the purpose of jamming foreign radio stations broadcasting to China, it now appears that this is what the ALLISS antennas are being used for.

In 2003, Thales UK's design won the competition for the Royal Navy Future Carrier (CVF) and the company now participates in an alliance company with BAE Systems and the United Kingdom's Ministry of Defence.

Thales Navigation, a division that produced satellite navigation units, was sold to private equity group Shah Capital Partners in 2006 for $170 million and renamed Magellan.

Acquisitions
In 2006, Thales acquired Australian Defence Industries, a major manufacturer of military equipment such as smokeless gunpowder and the Bushmaster IMV.

In April 2006, Thales announced it would be acquiring Alcatel's space business (67% of Alcatel Alenia Space and 33% of Telespazio), and Alcatel's Rail Signalling Solutions division in a deal which also raised Alcatel's ownership of Thales to 21.66 percent. The French government would also decrease its ownership in Thales to 27.1 percent from 31.3 percent as part of the acquisition. The deal would also include the Systems Integration activities (those not dedicated to telecoms operators, and covering mainly the transport and energy sectors). In January 2007, the 1.7 billion Euro deal ($2.24 billion) was approved.

In 2008, Thales acquired British Hardware security module vendor nCipher.

In December 2008, Alcatel agreed to sell a 20.8% stake in French engineering group Thales SA to Dassault Aviation SA for €1.57 billion ($2.27 billion).

In 2014, Alcatel-Lucent initiated talks to sell its cybersecurity unit to Thales. The deal was signed in October that year.

In 2016, Thales acquired Vormetric, a data security company, for $400M.

In 2017, it acquired Guavus and bid €4.76B for digital security company Gemalto.

In 2018, Thales committed to divesting nCipher as condition for its acquisition of Gemalto; in June 2019 it divested nCipher to Entrust.

Operations 

Thales Group supplies electronic devices and equipment used by the French Armed Forces from its past as Thomson-CSF, including the SPECTRA helmet for the army and the gendarmerie. It has worked with Dassault Aviation on the Dassault Rafale aircraft and made its SPECTRA defensive aids. Thales, as Thomson-CSF, was involved in the Taiwan frigates scandal, relating to the sale of s to Taiwan.

It is also present in Eurosam as Thomson-CSF was a founder of the consortium along Aérospatiale and Alenia Aeronautica. In February 2004, Thales was awarded a contract for a new command and control system for the French Navy, the SIC 21, that will be fitted on the Charles de Gaulle, many vessels and shore locations.

Additionally, the initially planned French aircraft carrier PA2 involved Thales as the main designer of the ship. However, the project was cancelled in 2013.

Thales is also working on X-ray imaging, finances, energy and operating commercial satellites.

By 2012, the company is mainly composed of five branches: Defense, Security, Space, Aerospace and Ground transportation.

Among the EU supported projects Thales participates in are:
 Galileo - the European satellite navigation system, similar to GPS/Glonass/BeiDou
 SESAR - both as aircraft equipment manufacturer and as ATM system vendor

Defence

The company's design won the competition for the Royal Navy Future Carrier (CVF). It is part of the AirTanker consortium, the winning bid for the RAF's Future Strategic Tanker Aircraft. Thales UK won the contract for the British Army UAV programme, Watchkeeper. It also produces the SWARM remote weapon station. Thales simulators include full motion devices as well as flat panel and other training facilities.

Thales Air Defence produces a range of short-range missile systems such as the Starstreak surface-to-air missile or Lightweight Multi-role Missile (LMM).

Aerospace
The Thales ATM (Air Traffic Management) solution is marketed under the name "TopSky", previously named "EuroCat". Thales supplies avionics to civil aircraft manufacturers, including Fly-By-Wire systems, cockpit systems, navigation computers, satellite communication, inflight entertainment and electrical systems. The coordination of Thales parts' servicing and maintenance is coordinated by its MRO division; OEMServices, which handles the repair flow for component maintenance support.

In November 2017, Thales acquired a UK radar provider called Aveillant which produces software-defined holographic radar technology, which is able to detect small targets such as drones.

In February 2018, Thales won on a A$1.2 billion ($946 million) contract with Airservices Australia and the Australian Department of Defence to unify Australia's civil and military airspace under a single air traffic control system, named "OneSKY".

Ground transportation
Thales has major involvement in the UK rail industry as a result of the Racal merger and the 2006 acquisition of Alcatel's Rail Signalling Solutions division and transport business. Thales is to modernize 40 per cent of London Tube network London Underground.

In Denmark, Thales now owns 100% of the "East-west Consortium" contracted for a nationwide travel card (Danish: "Rejsekort").

In India, Thales was selected in December 2014 by the New Delhi Metro Rail Corporation (DMRC) to deliver a completely automatic fare collection system, as well as ticketing equipment. Thales has also been contracted by Hyderabad Metro Rail since 2017 to provide train control automation and communication services for the metro in Hyderabad.

In 2014, the company was tasked with equipping the public transport system of Bordeaux, France, with a contactless ticketing and revenue collection system, to be installed by February 2017. However, due to delays, the system is not expected to be operational until 2019.

In Singapore, Thales was involved in a train collision resulting from a compatibility issue between the old signalling system's interface, and the new one. The accident resulted in 38 minor injuries. A similar incident would occur in March 2019 in Hong Kong on the Tsuen Wan line.

In Vietnam, the company was awarded a €265 million contract in 2017 to deliver the telecommunications system for the currently constructed Line 3 of the Hanoi metro. Running behind schedule by one year, the metro line is stated to be launched in 2023.

Other activities 
Thales is also a major manufacturer of in-flight entertainment systems on board airliners. Thales' primary competitors in this area of business include Panasonic Avionics Corporation, Rockwell Collins, and LiveTV (originally owned by JetBlue, now owned by Thales).

Thales also produces and installs ticketing and communications systems for public transportation via its ticketing and revenue collection division. In November 2016, Thales announced its intention to divest from its transport ticketing, revenue collection, road toll and car park management business. The company entered into negotiations with Paris-based Latour Capital, but the negotiations ended in 2017 after Latour Capital announced this business was "not aligned closely enough with its investment priorities." After subsequent talks with Chinese investors failed, Thales abandoned the divestment.

Thales international 
Thales' international subsidiaries generated 52% of the company's revenue in 2008, with Thales UK being the largest of these accounting for 13% of group revenue. Its large presence in the UK (largely as a result of the Racal acquisition) has resulted in several high-profile contracts.

Thales has offices in:
 Africa: South Africa, Egypt, Morocco.
 Asia: Oman, Saudi Arabia, United Arab Emirates, Qatar, Pakistan, India, China, Hong Kong, South Korea, Singapore, Japan, Vietnam, Taiwan
 Europe: Norway, United Kingdom, Netherlands, Germany, Belgium, France, Switzerland, Austria, Romania, Poland, Italy, Spain, Portugal, Hungary, Turkey
 Oceania: Australia
 North America: Canada, Mexico, United States
 South America: Brazil, Argentina, Dominican Republic.

Products 

 Watchkeeper WK450 drone
 TopSky air traffic control system
 Search Master and Ocean Master radars
 Bushmaster armoured vehicle
 F88 Austeyr assault rifle
 Hawkei armoured car
 Goalkeeper CIWS
 Line of Sight Communication Systems
 Starstreak missile
 Crotale missile
 Ground Master 400
 Ground Master 200
 Ground Master 200 Multi Mission
 Jamming Systems
 SelTrac
 Data Protection on Demand
 AVANT In-Flight Entertainment System
Connectivity

 Full motion simulator for the Scout Armoured Vehicle

 SOSNA-U Thermal Sight (used on Russian T-72B3 and T-80BVM tanks)

Financial information 
As of December 2020, Thales' major shareholders are the French state (25.68%) and Dassault Aviation (24.62%).

Controversies

Greater Manchester
A High Court case decided in 2012 between Thales (supplier of Greater Manchester's tram management system)  and Transport for Greater Manchester (TGM) considered the operation of an audit clause in a contract, and the extent to which a supplier must comply with this. Thales had submitted claims for increased costs and for extensions to the time allowed for delivery of the system. TGM made various requests for documents intended to better help assess their claims. The Court instructed Thales to supply the requested documents.

Bordeaux project mismanagement 
Although the ticketing system in Bordeaux was originally due for launch in summer 2017, multiple delays pushed the new launch date back by 20 months to 2019. The project's many setbacks are considered to reflect negatively on the city's reputation, with Bordeaux's city's mayor and former French prime minister Alain Juppé, calling Thales' inability to meet its commitments "unacceptable behaviour."

Centralised slush fund 
Michel Josserand, former head of THEC, a subsidiary of Thales, and Dominique Monleau, alleged that Thales has a centralised slush fund that it uses to bribe officials.

South Africa 

On 30 May 2005 Schabir Shaik, the financial advisor to Jacob Zuma, the former president of the African National Congress party, was found guilty by the High Court in Durban of organising a bribe on behalf of Thomson-CSF.

On 22 January 2020 the KwaZulu-Natal High Court in Pietermaritzburg ruled that both the Thales Group and Zuma could be criminally tried for alleged illegal arms dealings which Thales was allowed to undergo in South Africa. Zuma is said to have allowed these illegal Thales arms dealings when he was the nation's president and is also believed to have partaken in them as well.

Taiwanese naval order 

Around 1991–1993, French state owned Elf Aquitaine was involved (with other companies and countries) in selling frigates to Taiwan. On 10 June 2011 Thales Group and the French government were ordered to pay 630 million euros (almost a billion US dollars) in fines after the courts heard that bribes had been paid to the Taiwanese government to win this large naval contract. Part (about 27%) of the responsibility was transferred to Thales Group because it held the legacy from Thomson-CSF. , this is the largest corruption case in French history.

Components 
 Thales Air Defence Limited
 Thales Underwater Systems
 Thales Nederland
 Thales Optronics
 Thales Rail Signalling Solutions
 Thales Information System, (Belgium)
 Thales Avionics, (Melbourne, Florida)

See also 

 Bernard Favre d'Echallens
 Thomson SA

References

External links 
 

 
Aerospace companies of France
Aircraft component manufacturers of France
CAC 40
Companies listed on Euronext Paris
Defence companies of France
Electronics companies of France
Engineering companies of France
Multinational companies headquartered in France